Pindara serratilinea is a moth of the family Noctuidae first described by George Thomas Bethune-Baker in 1906. It is found in the Australian state of Queensland.

The wingspan is about 30 mm.

References

External links

Catocalinae